The Faenza–Lavezzola railway is a railway line in Emilia-Romagna, Italy.

The first section of the line, between Lavezzola and Lugo, was opened in 1888–89. It was completed in 1921 with the section from Lugo to Faenza.

See also 
 List of railway lines in Italy

References

Footnotes

Sources
 
 

Railway lines in Emilia-Romagna
Railway lines opened in 1921